Kamal Kumar is a Fijian jurist who served as Chief Justice of Fiji from 2019 to 2023.

Kumar was educated at the Queensland University of Technology in Australia, graduating with a bachelor of laws. he worked as a lawyer in Australia, and then in Fiji, before being appointed to the High Court of Fiji civil division in 2013.

From September 2018 he served as the head of the Fiji Human Rights and Anti-Discrimination Commission, and he served as a president of Dakshina India Andhra Sangam Fiji of Lautoka Branch for two consecutive term until 2012. He was appointed acting chief justice following the retirement of Anthony Gates in April 2019. The position was made permanent and he was formally sworn in as chief justice on 6 August 2021.

On 30 January 2023 Kumar was suspended by President Wiliame Katonivere after allegations of misbehaviour. Salesi Temo was appointed to act in his place.

References 

Living people
Year of birth missing (living people)
Fijian people of Indian descent
Queensland University of Technology alumni
21st-century Fijian judges
Chief justices of Fiji